According to the year 2015, women stand at the head of 7 out of 256 local authorities in Israel.

Municipal elections in Israel 
Municipal elections in Israel are elections in which the residents of the cities and local councils in Israel vote for the chairman of the local authority (mayor or municipality chairman), as well as the city councils or the local councils.

Since the foundation of the state of Israel in 1948 until 1978, when the municipal elections system has been reformed, residents would use one ballot to elect a political party. Once a coalition is formed, the mayor is elected by the council members.

Using the old electoral system (until 1978), 10 women were elected mayors. In 1978, the municipal electoral system was reformed and personalized, so that residents would use two ballots: one for the political party and the other for the position of mayor. Since the reform until today, 18 women were elected as mayors.

Statistics of Female representation in municipalities 
Looking over the years, statistics show an increase in the number of women elected as council members and mayors: In 1965, women formed 3.1% of the general number of council members and mayors, while in 1989 the percentage increased to 8.5%. In 1993, the percentage rose to 10.9% and 15.4% by 1998. Female representation has been consistently widespread; according to the statistics of 1998, 88.8% of the Jewish city/town councils included women. In the Arab villages and cities, women formed 0.4% of the total number of elected council members and mayors.

Promotion of female representation in Israel 
Although there has been an increasing number of women elected to hold municipal positions, the question of the number of female representation has been brought up many times in research and different conventions. Various explanations for the relatively low number of women were proposed: 
 Women might still shy away from being politically involved. 
 Women might still feel responsible for maintaining the household and raising the children.
 The connection between state and religion.
 Pressing issues like state security make topics like gender equality seem minor. 
 Another theory claims there is a political mechanism to maintain the superiority of men.

Nevertheless, some of the political parties in Israel strive to secure seats for women in municipal elections. Meretz party, for example, secures 40% of the list of contenders to municipal council for women. Consequently, women in Meretz have achieved a 37% female representation of the total number of women in city and town councils.

In addition, WEPOWER ("Ken"), an Israeli NGO that was formed in 2000, proactively promotes women's leadership to the highest levels of decision-making and elected position. Many of today's female MKs, mayors and council members are alumni of the WEPOWER training programs.

Women mayors in Israel throughout the years

References

Municipal elections in Israel
Women in Israel